

This is a list of the National Register of Historic Places listings in southern Chester County, Pennsylvania.

This is intended to be a complete list of the properties and districts on the National Register of Historic Places in southern Chester County, Pennsylvania. Southern Chester County is defined as being the municipalities south of the Philadelphia Main Line and west of West Chester. The locations of National Register properties and districts for which the latitude and longitude coordinates are included below, may be seen in a map.

There are 322 properties and districts listed on the Register in Chester County, including 7 National Historic Landmarks. Southern Chester County includes 121 properties and districts, including 2 National Historic Landmarks; the county's remaining properties and districts are listed elsewhere.

Current listings

|}

Former listings

|}

References

South